The following television stations operate on virtual channel 38 in the United States:

 K04QR-D in Esparto, California
 K14RK-D in Phoenix, Arizona
 K23PL-D in Shonto, Arizona
 K24NS-D in Stateline, Nevada
 K28NV-D in Ponca City, Oklahoma
 K28PQ-D in Saint Cloud, Minnesota
 K31OL-D in Salinas, California
 K34PG-D in Payson, Arizona
 K36NN-D in West Plains, Missouri
 K36OD-D in North La Pine, Oregon
 K38DZ-D in Joplin, Montana
 K38JX-D in Grand Junction, Colorado
 KACN-LP in Anchorage, Alaska
 KALO in Honolulu, Hawaii
 KASN in Pine Bluff, Arkansas
 KBIS-LD in Turlock, California
 KCNS in San Francisco, California
 KHWB-LD in Eugene, Oregon
 KJCS-LD in Colorado Springs, Colorado
 KKEI-CD in Portland, Oregon
 KMCI-TV in Lawrence, Kansas
 KNXT-LD in Bakersfield, California
 KPJR-TV in Greeley, Colorado
 KPMR in Santa Barbara, California
 KPSP-CD in Cathedral City, California
 KSCC in Corpus Christi, Texas
 KSCE in El Paso, Texas
 KXHG-LD in Sunnywide, Washington
 KZHO-LD in Houston, Texas
 W16DV-D in Alexander City, Alabama
 W16EB-D in Augusta, Kentucky
 W17DZ-D in Sister Bay, Wisconsin
 W34EY-D in Huntsville, Alabama
 WADL in Mount Clemens, Michigan
 WAWV-TV in Terre Haute, Indiana
 WBEH-CD in Miami, Florida
 WCPX-TV in Chicago, Illinois
 WDSS-LD in Syracuse, New York
 WEIJ-LD in Fort Wayne, Indiana
 WEPX-TV in Greenville, North Carolina
 WHDO-CD in Orlando, Florida
 WIGL-LD in Athens, Georgia
 WJGN-CD in Chesapeake, Virginia
 WJWN-TV in San Sebastian, Puerto Rico
 WKMR in Morehead, Kentucky
 WLTZ in Columbus, Georgia
 WMKG-CD in Muskegon, Michigan
 WMUB-LD in Warner Robins, Georgia
 WMWD-LD in Madison, Wisconsin
 WNEH in Greenwood, South Carolina
 WNGN-LD in Troy, New York
 WNOL-TV in New Orleans, Louisiana
 WNXG-LD in Tallahassee, Florida
 WPNE-TV in Green Bay, Wisconsin
 WPXR-TV in Roanoke, Virginia
 WPXU-LD in Amityville, New York
 WPYM-LD in Little Rock, Arkansas
 WSBK-TV in Boston, Massachusetts
 WSWB in Scranton, Pennsylvania
 WTSJ-LD in Milwaukee, Wisconsin
 WTTA in St. Petersburg, Florida
 WWXY-LD in San Juan, Puerto Rico

The following stations, which are no longer licensed, formerly operated on virtual channel 38:
 K24NL-D in Weed, California
 K29MM-D in Billings, Montana
 K36NJ-D in Monett, Missouri
 K38OF-D in Crowley, Louisiana
 K38OR-D in Jonesboro, Arkansas
 KCIO-LD in Ontario, California
 KNDX-LD in Dickinson, North Dakota
 KVFW-LD in Fort Worth, Texas
 KZMD-LD in Lufkin, Texas
 W38EM-D in Albany, Georgia
 WALM-LD in Sebring, Florida
 WFKB-LD in Midland, Michigan

References

38 virtual